ITV Food is the name given to the category of cookery shows broadcast on the ITV Network. Although the ITV Food website has been dropped there are still several cookery programmes and items on other daytime shows.

Shows

External links

British cooking television shows
ITV (TV network) original programming